Split is a Canadian docufiction film, directed by Lawrence Côté-Collins and released in 2016. The film stars Marjolaine Beauchamp as Anick, a social worker making a film about criminal rehabilitation that centres on ex-convict Scott (Ronald Cyr) and his girlfriend Jessie (Whitney Lafleur).

The film premiered on July 29, 2016 at the Fantasia International Film Festival, before opening commercially in September.

The film received two Prix Iris nominations at the 19th Quebec Cinema Awards, for Best Editing (Jules Saulnier) and Revelation of the Year (Lafleur).

References

External links
 

2016 films
2016 drama films
Canadian docufiction films
Quebec films
Films set in Quebec
Films shot in Quebec
French-language Canadian films
2010s Canadian films